Fourth Empire may refer to:
Fourth British Empire, a concept in the historiography of the British Empire
Fourth world-empire, the last of the four kingdoms of Daniel
Roman Empire, the traditional interpretation of the fourth kingdom of Daniel in Christian eschatology
Fourth Reich, a hypothetical successor of Nazi Germany
Fourth Empire, a fictional organization in Star Gladiator
Fourth Empire, the main antagonists of Galaxy Force (video game)

See also
First Empire (disambiguation)
Second Empire (disambiguation)
Third Empire (disambiguation)
Fifth Empire